The Ragpicker's Dream is the third solo studio album by British singer-songwriter and guitarist Mark Knopfler, released on 30 September 2002 by Mercury Records internationally, and by Warner Bros. Records in the United States. The album received generally favorable reviews upon its release.

Composition
The album is a collection of songs written from the point of view of poor but dignified itinerant men, struggling to get by in life, often enjoying small triumphs. Knopfler gives a folk imprint to the whole album without relying too heavily on the acoustic guitar. The first song, "Why Aye Man", was used as the theme tune for the third series of Auf Wiedersehen, Pet which first aired in 2002. The album contains numerous other references to North East England, including the village of Tow Law on "Hill Farmer's Blues".

Artwork
The album cover shows a black and white photograph of a man and a woman dancing in a kitchen. The photograph was taken by Elliott Erwitt and is titled "Spain, Valencia, 1952, Robert and Mary Frank". The photo was also used as the book cover for two novels: The Marriage Artist by Andrew Winer (2010, Henry Holt & Company), and Ancient Light by John Banville (2012, Viking).

Critical reception

In his review for AllMusic, Hal Horowitz gave the album three out of five stars, calling the album "a pleasant, classy, often inspired effort whose unassuming charms are best appreciated after repeated listenings." Horowitz continued:

Horowitz acknowledges Knopfler's versatility and breadth of music on the album: the atmospherics of "Hill Farmer's Blues" and "Fare Thee Well Northumberland", the unaccompanied folk/blues of "Marbletown", the "shuffling groove" on the spooky "You Don't Know You're Born", the mid-tempo "Coyote", the authentic honky tonk swing of "Daddy's Gone to Knoxville", and Roger Milleresque "Quality Shoe". Horowitz singles out the title track, which he describes as "an homage to the American roots music he's always admired."

Track listing
All songs were written by Mark Knopfler.

Limited edition bonus disc

 Singles from the album
 Why Aye Man - Released on September 16, 2002

Personnel
Music
Mark Knopfler – vocals, guitars
 Richard Bennett – guitars
 Jim Cox – piano, Hammond organ
 Guy Fletcher – keyboards, backing vocals (8)
 Glenn Worf – bass guitar
 Chad Cromwell – drums
 Glen Duncan – violin (11)
 Paul Franklin – pedal steel guitar (3,5,10)
 Mike Henderson – harmonica (6)
 Jimmy Nail – backing vocals (1)
 Tim Healy – backing vocals (1)

Production
 Mark Knopfler – producer
 Chuck Ainlay – producer, engineer, mixing
 John Saylor – engineer
 Jon Bailey – engineer
 Jake Jackson – engineer
 Tony Cousins – mastering
 Stephen Walker – art direction
 Neil Kellerhouse – art direction, design
 Elliot Erwitt – photography (front cover)
 Ken Sharp – photography
 North Bank Fred – photography (trains)

Charts

Weekly charts

Year-end charts

Certifications and sales

References
Notes

Citations

External links
 The Ragpicker's Dream at Mark Knopfler official website

2002 albums
Mark Knopfler albums
Albums produced by Mark Knopfler
Albums produced by Chuck Ainlay